Gulp: Adventures on the Alimentary Canal is a nonfiction work by science author Mary Roach, published in April 2013 by W.W. Norton & Company.

Topics covered
The book covers 17 topics:

 Nose Job: Tasting has little to do with taste
 I'll Have the Putrescine: Your pet is not like you.
 Liver and Opinions: Why we eat what we eat and despise the rest
 The Longest Meal: Can thorough chewing lower the national debt?
 Hard to Stomach: The acid relationship of William Beaumont and Alexis St. Martin.
 Spit Gets a Polish: Someone ought to bottle the stuff
 A Bolus of Cherries: Life at the oral processing lab
 Big Gulp: How to survive being swallowed alive
 Dinner's Revenge: Can the eaten eat back?
 Stuffed: The science of eating yourself to death
 Up Theirs: The alimentary canal as criminal accomplice 
 Inflammable You: Fun with hydrogen and methane
 Dead Man's Bloat: And other diverting tales from the history of flatulence research. 
 Smelling a Rat: Does noxious flatus do more than clear a room?
 Eating Backward: Is the digestive tract a two-way street?
 I'm All Stopped Up: Elvis Presley's megacolon, and other ruminations on death by constipation.
 The Ick Factor: We can cure you, but there's just one thing

Reviews 
Maslin, Janet (April 4, 2013). Food and You, From One End to the Other. Books of the Times (The New York Times). Retrieved June 1, 2013.
Publishers Weekly. (January 21, 2013) Gulp: Adventures on the Alimentary Canal Starred Review (Publishers Weekly.) Retrieved June 1, 2013.

References

External links 
 Gulp Video Book Trailer
 Mary Roach's website.
 Gulp page on Publisher's Site, W.W. Norton and Company
 Roach talks about Stiff on NPR
 Roach talks about Gulp on Bullseye with Jesse Thorn

2013 non-fiction books
Biology books
Digestive system
Popular science books
W. W. Norton & Company books